Attila Mesterházy (born 30 January 1974) is a Hungarian politician, who served as the seventh chairman of the Hungarian Socialist Party (MSZP) from 10 July 2010 to 29 May 2014. He was the party's candidate for the position of Prime Minister of Hungary in the 2010 and 2014 parliamentary elections.

Studies
Mesterházy was born in 1974 in Pécs, Hungary. In the years 1988–1992 he attended secondary school (Lovassy László Gimnázium) in Veszprém. In 1992–1997 he studied economics at the Corvinus University in Budapest, obtaining a diploma in 1997. He was a Fellow at the University of Valladolid in Spain (1995–1996), Diplomatic Academy of Vienna (Vienna School of International Studies) (1996–1998) and the University of Groningen in the Netherlands (1997). He was a Ph.D. student at the Corvinus University in Budapest (1997–1999) and then at the Faculty of Physical Education and Sport Sciences of Semmelweis University in Budapest (2004–2005), but he has not earned a Ph.D. degree.

Political career
In 1997 and in 1998 Mesterházy worked in the Prime Minister's Office as a specialist on economic and European integration. In 1999–2000 he was manager of the public relations firm Hill and Knowlton. In 2000 he returned to the political scene and became an advisor to Prime Minister Péter Medgyessy. In 2002–2004 he served as Secretary of State for Children, Youth and Sports in his office. In 2004 he joined the National Assembly of Hungary. From 2004 to 2006 he served as State Secretary in the Ministry of Youth, Family, Social Affairs and Equal Opportunities during the rule of Prime Minister Ferenc Gyurcsány. In 2003 he was a member of the national executive of the MSZP. In April 2009, was one of its vice-presidents, and was appointed leader of its parliamentary caucus.

On 12 December 2009, during the MSZP congress, by a vote of 90% of delegates, was elected the Socialist candidate for the post of prime minister in parliamentary elections in 2010.

Mesterházy was elected leader of the Socialist Party in July 2010. As chairman of MSZP in the 2010 municipal elections he sang "bikicsunáj", while also using the term "comrades" (elvtársak) to address other party members and sympathizers. He was re-elected as party chairman against Tibor Szanyi on 31 March 2012. During his leadership, Mesterházy stabilized the party which was "in ruins" after the supporters of Ferenc Gyurcsány left MSZP to form Democratic Coalition (DK). However, there were also criticisms that Mesterházy, similar to structure of the right-wing Fidesz, over-centralized the party and overshadowed his internal opposition and former influential leaders, such as László Kovács, Ildikó Lendvai and Imre Szekeres. According to the critics, he set up the parliamentary group with own supporters, who occupied the most important positions within the party.

Under his leadership, the Socialist Party entered into an alliance with four other parties in January 2014 for the spring parliamentary election. Following a months of wrangling between Gordon Bajnai and him, Mesterházy was elected candidate for Prime Minister of the Unity electoral alliance, but his movement failed to win and suffered the largest defeat. After that the electoral coalition disestablished. On the 2014 European Parliament election, MSZP suffered the largest defeat since the 1990 parliamentary election, gaining third place and only 10% of the votes. After the obvious failure, Mesterházy and the entire presidium of the Socialist Party tendered their resignation. Nevertheless, Mesterházy said he wished to keep his position of parliamentary group leader. However, three days later Mesterházy resigned from his both positions after the critical voices intensified against him.

Mesterházy chaired the parliament's Budgetary Committee from September 2016 to May 2018. He was re-elected MP via his party's national list in the 2018 Hungarian parliamentary election. He became a member of the Budgetary Committee and a vice-chairman of the Foreign Committee. As a member of the consultative interparliamentary organisation since 2006, Mesterházy was elected head of the NATO Parliamentary Assembly's Socialist group in November 2018. Mesterházy was elected one of the vice presidents of the NATO Parliamentary Assembly in October 2019. Two months later, after the parliament's president Madeleine Moon was defeated in the 2019 United Kingdom general election and thus she was unable to complete her second term, Mesterházy was appointed as acting President of the NATO PA on 16 December 2019.

Personal life
Attila Mesterházy is married and has two children. He speaks English and Spanish.

References

External links
Adatlapja az MSZP honlapján
Tevékenysége a Parlamentben

|-

|-

1974 births
Hungarian Socialist Party politicians
Living people
Members of the National Assembly of Hungary (2002–2006)
Members of the National Assembly of Hungary (2006–2010)
Members of the National Assembly of Hungary (2010–2014)
Members of the National Assembly of Hungary (2014–2018)
Members of the National Assembly of Hungary (2018–2022)
People from Pécs
Corvinus University of Budapest alumni